School's Out and Other Hits is a 2004 greatest hits album by American rock musician Alice Cooper. The album focuses on Alice Cooper's hits with his former band of the same name and as a solo artist.

Track listing 
 "School's Out"
 "Under My Wheels"
 "Be My Lover"
 "Elected"
 "No More Mr. Nice Guy"
 "Only Women Bleed"
 "Welcome to My Nightmare"
 "I Never Cry"
 "Clones (We're All)"
 "I'm Eighteen"

References

Alice Cooper compilation albums
2004 greatest hits albums